Willy Trenk-Trebitsch (March 11, 1902 – September 21, 1983) was an Austrian actor.  

He was born in Vienna. He was especially famous for his performances as Mack the Knife in The Threepenny Opera; he also had a film career. He died in Berlin, aged 81.

Partial filmography

 Panic in Chicago (1931) - Kriminalbeamter Charles
 The Other Side (1931) - Koch
 Einer Frau muß man alles verzeih'n (1931) - Fritz Meyer, Konfektionsreisender
 Her Majesty, Love (1931) - Minor Role (uncredited)
 Rasputin, Demon with Women (1932) - Ossipowitsch, Rasputins Sekretär
 The Strange Death of Adolf Hitler (1943) - Col. Von Zechwitz
 Hitchhike to Happiness (1945) - Ladislaus Prenska
 Inside Job (1946) - Cordet
 The Searching Wind (1946) - Ponette
 White Tie and Tails (1946) - Emil
 I'll Be Yours (1947) - Captain
 The Guilt of Janet Ames (1947) - Headwaiter (uncredited)
 The Corpse Came C.O.D. (1947) - Fields
 The Exile (1947) - Jacques - Footman
 Cass Timberlane (1947) - Raveau (uncredited)
 Letter from an Unknown Woman (1948) - Fritzel (uncredited)
 My Sister and I (1954) - König
 They Were So Young (1954) - Senor Bulanos
 The Eternal Waltz (1954) - Leibrock - Kammerdiener
 Holiday in Tyrol (1956) - Franz, Diener
 Der Schinderhannes (1958) - Reichsgraf von Cleve-Boost
 Heldinnen (1960) - Ricaut
 Question 7 (1961)
 Karl May (1974) - Rodolf Lebius (final film role)

References 
 Article in the Hamburger Abendblatt (in German)
 Archive at the Akademie der Künste (in German)

1902 births
1983 deaths
Austrian male stage actors
Austrian male film actors
Austrian expatriates in Germany
Jewish Austrian male actors
Male actors from Vienna
20th-century Austrian male actors